The Society for Behavioral Neuroendocrinology is an interdisciplinary scientific organization dedicated to the study of hormonal processes and neuroendocrine systems that regulate behavior.

Publications 
SBN publishes the scientific journal Hormones and Behavior.

External links
 

Neuroscience organizations